This is a list of all media appearances of the Marvel Comics character Storm.

Television
Storm has made numerous appearances in Marvel television shows, beginning with Spider-Man and His Amazing Friends up to the current Wolverine and the X-Men.

X-Men

Storm appears in the X-Men animated series of the mid-1990s, where she was originally voiced by Iona Morris for the first season and the first 7 episodes of Season 2, and then Alison Sealy-Smith for the rest of the series and the final version of the Season 1 episodes replacing Morris as the voice of Storm. She has served as second-in-command of the team. She also has many episodes dedicated to her. In the Season 5 episode "Storm Front", she is called upon by Arkon to save his entire planet, Polemachus. Shortly after aiding him, Arkon requests that remains with him and rule alongside him as empress. Arkon asks her to marry him. However, she leaves him after learning that he was the one responsible for the calamity in the first place and that his ships are bringing thousands of slaves from nearby planets, and comes to the realization that Arkon is a tyrant.

In Season 2 two-part episode "Whatever It Takes", the Shadow King lures Storm home to Mt. Kilimanjaro by "possessing" her young spiritual son Mjnari, so Rogue and Storm travel to Africa to stop the Shadow King. After a brief fight Mjnari lures Shadow King back into the Astral Plain and the Shadow King is again trapped there. Storm also recurs more of her own episodes in "Savage Land Pt. 1 and 2", where Sauron captures Storm for her powers. During the series, she shows no love interest in Forge, however she does for Wolverine in an alternate reality episode entitled "One Man's Worth". She is also claustrophobic. Usually before activating her powers, she will chant a spell-like phrase pertaining to the specific element of which she calls upon. She is often seen throughout the series as Professor Xavier's comforter as well as a dear friend of Rogue's.

X-Men: Evolution

In X-Men: Evolution, Storm is portrayed as a teacher at Professor Xavier's Xavier Institute. In this version, she is the aunt of young X-Man Evan Daniels (codename Spyke) and a member of the staff at the Xavier Institute. Her fashion sense is usually purple colors and earth tones wearing either a skirt or silky fabric. She has a sister named Vivian, who does not exist in the comics. She is also the keeper of the X-Mansion's greenhouse, mostly because she is a terrific gardener and she needs no watering can and has been considering as the standby of Professor Xavier. In the episode "African Storm", her past life is revealed. Storm is tormented by Houngan, an evil African shaman who wants to take over Africa. There is no evidence she was a thief in this adaption. Storm and the X-Men have to stop an enemy who knows every weakness of hers. The Houngan used mostly Storm's claustrophobia. During the end of Season 4 in "Ascension (Part 1)", Apocalypse turns Storm into one of the four Horsemen. She gains both the ability to produce even greater storms. She is later turned back at the end of the series. She was voiced by Canadian actress, Kirsten Williamson.

Wolverine and the X-Men

She appears in Wolverine and the X-Men voiced by actress Susan Dalian, though her role in the show is much smaller compared to other versions. She wears a somewhat modified version of her Uncanny X-Men/Fantastic Four costume. Storylines such as her past as a child thief and involvement with the Shadow King have maintained. In the episode "Overflow", Professor X shows Wolverine a future vision of a destroyed Africa and reveals that Storm is the one who destroyed it. It is not long before the Shadow King takes control of Storm's body. Shadow King manipulates Storm into fighting the X-Men and destroying parts of Africa. After Iceman, Shadowcat, and Beast are knocked unconscious Wolverine and Cyclops are left to save Storm while Emma Frost telepathically battles the Shadow King in Storm's mind. Emma separates the Shadow King from Storm's body long enough for him to be destroyed and Storm leaves Africa to rejoin the X-Men. Storm says that she is staying alongside her family (the X-Men) and that they must ensure when Professor awakens, it is a world worth living in. Ororo was also in a romantic relationship with Angel up until his transformation into Archangel. Such a close romantic relationship was never found in the comics or other animated series. Compared to the other media representations of the character this adaptation of Storm is the most reserved and timid, a far cry from her comic book counterpart and other televised adaptations. For instance, this Storm has been knocked out or incapacitated numerous times more often than other X-Men of the show to focus more on Wolverine. Storm, in the comics as well as the other animated X-Men series, was one of, if not the last X-Men to be taken down in a fight. However, her importance to the team is invaluable as the team recognizes her as the strongest and most powerful X-Man. When berated by a hoard of Sentinels and Storm is knocked out, Cyclops stresses how important it is to wake her to attack before the robots annihilate them all.

Marvel Super Hero Squad
Storm appears in The Super Hero Squad Show voiced by Cree Summer. Storm appears to go to Xavier's until Mysterious Mayhem at the Mutant Academy, where she graduates with Wolverine. She says that the Black Panther is her boyfriend, though in the later comics they are married.

Black Panther
Storm appears in Black Panther voiced by Jill Scott.

Marvel Anime
This incarnation of Storm in the Marvel Anime series is modeled in facial appearance after the movies' version played by Halle Berry. In personality she is portrayed being confident, level-headed, calming and slightly shown as passionate; being sent by Xavier just in case a feud was to be built between Wolverine and Cyclops in the 1st episode. Her personality and characteristics seem arguably more based on the Mainstream comic's version than the Ultimate comic's version. She is a reminder to her Animated 1990s version as she is shown to be caring and almost a mentor to the young in understanding their mutation as she has helped Hisako in episode 5, as she did to Jubilee in the Animated series. She seems to play a prime role alongside the other X-Men equally and is shown to be a powerhouse and has enormously great control over her abilities. She is voiced by Aya Hisakawa in the Japanese Dub and Danielle Nicolet in the English Dub.

Marvel Disk Wars: The Avengers
Storm first appeared in episodes 20-21 of the Marvel Disk Wars: The Avengers anime series. She is voiced by Yayoi Sugaya in the Japanese dub and Danielle Nicolet in the English dub.

Wolverine versus Sabretooth
Storm appears in the Wolverine versus Sabretooth motion comic, voiced by Kathleen Barr.

Guest appearances
Storm first made guest appearances on the Spider-Man and His Amazing Friends in the episodes titled "A Firestar Is Born", "The Education of a Superhero", and "The X-Men Adventure" alongside various other X-Men.  She was voiced by Kathy Garver in "The X-Men Adventure" and Anne Lockhart in "A Firestar Is Born".

In 1989, Storm then appeared in a TV pilot that later was released on video in X-Men: Pryde of the X-Men. Andi Chapman provided her voice.

Storm guest-starred in Spider-Man: The Animated Series in the 1990s. First in the Season 2 episodes "The Mutant Agenda" and "Mutant's Revenge," along with the rest of the X-Men (voiced by Alison Sealy-Smith). Then, in Season 5, Storm appears in all three of the 'Secret Wars' episodes (voiced by Iona Morris).

In the animated film Next Avengers: Heroes of Tomorrow, depicting a futuristic team of Avengers composed of the children of classic Marvel heroes, Storm (though unnamed in the film) and T'Challa, as well as the other Avengers, die while fighting the indestructible robot, Ultron.  As the lone survivor, Iron Man raises Storm and T'Challa's son Azari along with the other children of the fallen Avengers.  The children eventually reform the Avengers as its new members.  Azari inherits Storm's electrical abilities, able to focus them on panther-shaped energy or items such as a bo staff, as well as T'Challa's martial arts prowess and the spirit of the Panther God.  He becomes fiercely dedicated to Iron Man, often attempting to get his teammates to listen to Tony Stark's orders.

In the Ultimate Spider-Man episode "Electro", a Daily Bugle news crawl mentions that Storm has been quoted as saying she had nothing to do with Electro's lightning attacks on New York.

Commercials
Storm has appeared in American television commercials for Universal Studios theme park, M&M's, and Visa Check cards.

Film

Halle Berry portrayed Storm in four installments of the X-Men film franchise: X-Men, X2, X-Men: The Last Stand and X-Men: Days of Future Past. A younger version of the character appeared in the 2016 film X-Men: Apocalypse and the 2019 film Dark Phoenix, portrayed by Alexandra Shipp.

In X-Men, she is a member of the X-Men team when Wolverine encounters them, saving him from Sabretooth. She fights with the other X-Men in order to save Rogue and stop Magneto, and succeed to defeat on her own Toad. In the sequel X2, the X-Men teams up with Magneto in order to save their race. She and Jean Grey find Nightcrawler and persuade him to join the X-Men. She and Nightcrawler later succeed in stopping a brainwashed Xavier from killing humans and free him from William Stryker's Cerebro. In The Last Stand, in which she is given a larger role, she acts as the new leader of the X-Men after the supposed death of Charles Xavier, and finally succeeds to defeat Magneto once again.  It is also implied that Storm harbors an unrequited love for Wolverine, and is one of the few people who are aware of his affections for Jean. This is shown in a deleted scene in Days of Future Past where Storm and Wolverine share a kiss. In The Wolverine, she appears in a photograph with Wolverine in Yashida's scrapbook. In Days of Future Past, set many years later, Wolverine's mind is sent into the past in order to change history and stop the war between humans and mutants before it begins. Storm, along with other mutants, try to stop the Sentinels until Wolverine succeeds his mission. Unfortunately, Storm is killed by a Sentinel impaling her in a surprise attack from behind as it climbed the wall, throwing her body down the mountainside. However, Wolverine's mission is a success, and these events are erased and Wolverine awakens into a new timeline, in which Storm is still alive.

In the first film, Berry attempted to portray Storm with the Kenyan accent she has in the comics, but this aspect was decidedly left out of the following two films. For her role in The Last Stand, Berry received a People's Choice Awards for "Best Female Action Hero."

A young Ororo Munroe makes a cameo appearance in X-Men: First Class during a scene where a young Charles Xavier uses Cerebro to scan the minds of mutants across the globe. A photo of Berry as Storm also appears in The Wolverine. Another young version of the character was to appear in a cameo in the prequel X-Men Origins: Wolverine portrayed by April Elleston Enahoro. Some of the footage was incorporated into some teaser trailers. The footage was not included in the final release of the film but was included as Bonus Material on the DVD/Blu-ray release. Storm's brief appearance in the film takes place when Stryker's team is interrogating people in Africa while searching for adamantium. A young white-haired child is seen watching the interrogations while a storm begins to brew.

Storm appears in 2016's X-Men: Apocalypse, with Alexandra Shipp portraying a young Storm. She is initially manipulated and her Mohawk hair color permanently turns white (like in the original film trilogy) by the newly awakened Apocalypse, contrary to canon in the comics, which depicts her hair color originating from her ancestry. She joins his Horsemen of Apocalypse as Famine in the belief that his goal is to save the world. However, once she witnesses him abandon the wounded Angel for failing and his subsequent brutal assault on the X-Men, she sees his real colors and turns against him to help the X-Men, afterward joining them.

In the 2017 film Logan, Storm appears on the cover of the fictional X-Men comic owned by Laura, fighting Sauron with Wolverine, as illustrated for the film by Dan Panosian.

Shipp portrays the character in a brief cameo in Deadpool 2, and reprises the role in Dark Phoenix.

Theme park ride
Along with Doctor Doom, the Hulk, and Spider-Man, Storm also has a ride in Marvel Super Hero Island of  Universal Studios.  The ride, based on a common teacup ride, is called "Storm Force Accelatron".  It includes fog effects and strobe lights (to simulate lightning) which can be seen if ridden after dark.  She is the first superheroine and the first X-Man to have a ride named after her.

Video games
 Storm appeared in the X-Men arcade game by Konami.
 Storm appeared in Spider-Man and the X-Men in Arcade's Revenge by LJN and Flying Edge.
 Storm appeared in X-Men: Children of the Atom, by Capcom, voiced by Catherine Disher.
 Storm appeared in X-Men vs. Street Fighter, voiced by Catherine Disher.
 Storm appeared in Marvel vs. Capcom series. In Marvel vs. Capcom: Clash of Super Heroes, she was one of the assist characters.  In Marvel vs. Capcom 2: New Age of Heroes, voiced by Catherine Disher. She is often referred as being tied to Sentinel or beating him as the best character in the game.
 Storm appeared in the first-person shooter X-Men: The Ravages of Apocalypse.
 Storm appeared in X-Men: Mutant Academy.
 Storm appeared in X-Men: Mutant Academy 2, voiced by Alison Sealy-Smith.
 Storm appeared in X-Men: Next Dimension.
 Storm appeared in X-Men Legends, voiced by Cheryl Carter.
 Storm appeared in X-Men Legends II: Rise of Apocalypse, voiced by Dawnn Lewis. She has special dialogue with Dark Beast.
 Storm is a playable character in the EA video game Marvel Nemesis: Rise of the Imperfects, voiced by Estelle Liebenberg.
 Storm appears as a non-playable character in the video game based on the film, X-Men: The Official Game, voiced by Debra Wilson.
 Dawnn Lewis reprises her role of Storm who is a playable character in Marvel: Ultimate Alliance. Outside of bringing up her history of fighting the Mandarin to Nick Fury, she has special dialogue with Dark Colossus, Henry Pym, Lilandra, Professor X, Senator Kelly and Vision. One simulation disc has Storm defending her friends from Hussar and another has Blade defending Storm from Dark Spider-Man.
 Storm is a playable character in Spider-Man And Friends: Doc Ock's Challenge.
 Storm made an appearance in 1992's The Amazing Spider-Man 2 for the Game Boy.
 Storm appears in the PlayStation 2 and PSP versions of Spider-Man: Web of Shadows, voiced by Tangie Ambrose. She appears as an assist character who will call upon lightning to take out any enemy.
 Dawnn Lewis reprises her role of Storm who is a playable character in Marvel: Ultimate Alliance 2. She is locked into the Anti-Reg side during the Civil War portion of the game version of PlayStation 2, PlayStation Portable and Wii. In the game she has a special conversation with the Black Panther.
 Storm appears as a playable character in the Marvel Super Hero Squad video game. Cree Summer reprised her role.
 A Storm costume is available as downloadable content for the LittleBigPlanet, as part of "Marvel Costume Kit 4".
 Storm appears in the crossover fighting games Marvel vs. Capcom 3: Fate of Two Worlds and Ultimate Marvel vs. Capcom 3. Susan Dalian reprises her role. She wears her more classical outfit worn in the comics compared to the previous Marvel vs. Capcom title. She also has an additional Hyper Combo.
 Storm is a playable character in Marvel Super Hero Squad Online, in both her modern outfit and her mohawk alternate look, voiced by Grey DeLisle.
 Storm is a playable character in the Facebook game Marvel: Avengers Alliance.
 Storm appears as a playable character in the 2012 fighting game Marvel Avengers: Battle for Earth, voiced by Danielle Nicolet.
 Storm was a playable character in the MMORPG Marvel Heroes, voiced again by Danielle Nicolet.
 Storm appears as a playable character in Lego Marvel Super Heroes, voiced again by Danielle Nicolet.
 There are four playable versions of Storm ("Modern", "Classic", "Mohawk" and "Ororo Munroe") in the match-three mobile game Marvel Puzzle Quest. Storm is one of the first characters that a new player to the game is able to recruit.
 Storm appears as a playable character in Marvel: Future Fight.
 Storm appears as a playable character in Marvel Powers United VR, voiced by Kimberly Brooks.
 Storm will appear as a playable character in Marvel Ultimate Alliance 3: The Black Order, voiced by Mara Junot.
 Storm appears as a playable character in 2019 MOBA game Marvel Super War. Her role in the game is energy with beginner difficulty to play. She uses lightning and wind as main attacks with her ultimate move is she summons forth a thunder strike in targeted area, before the lightning diffuses into X-shaped area, and her ultimate will immediately reset if it is able to eliminate any hero.
 Storm is a playable character in Marvel Future Revolution, voiced again by Kimberly Brooks. Many other versions of Storm from alternate realities also appear as NPCs, such as one from the Earth colonized by Asgardians or one who became a corrupted thrall of Dormammu.
 Storm is an unlockable outfit in Fortnite Battle Royale Chapter 2, Season 4, titled "Nexus War".

Live performance
 Storm will appear in the Marvel Universe: LIVE! arena show.

Toys
 Storm is the fourteenth figurine in the Classic Marvel Figurine Collection.
 Toy Biz- Storm was among the first X-Men figures in Marvel's 1991 X-Men line, a figure that was reissued in 1994 as female figures in the line grew more popular. Storm would go on to become one of the most popular X-Men figurines, issued across multiple lines in assorted scales. Storm had a 10-inch figure in the Marvel Universe line, three 9-inch mego-style figures as part of their Famous Covers collection, and multiple 6-inch and 5-inch action figures throughout the X-Men toyline in multiple costumes, as well as numerous exclusive figures. Other figures were also issued for the X-Men Evolution and X-Men Movie toylines. Notable variations include a Joe Mad-styled Storm, a Savage Land Storm, and a Storm in the original X-Men uniform in an exclusive boxset modeled after the team as they appeared in Uncanny X-Men #275. A Mohawk Storm action figure was issued exclusively in Canada.
 Notable oddities include plush versions of Storm, a Storm packaged with a Storm-themed giant robot, and a fashion-doll scale Storm based on the X-Men animated series.
 Hasbro- a 3 inch Storm is scheduled for the Secret Wars collection of Hasbro's Marvel Universe line in her Mohawk look. In addition, Hasbro has also created assorted Super Hero Squad versions of Storm. A new Marvel Legends-scale Storm was slated, in her original Dave Cockrum outfit, as shown in a poll for Wizard magazine, but is currently on hold.
 Storm was featured in the Marvel Superheroes Happy Meal promotion in the 1990s, alongside fellow X-Men Wolverine and Jubilee.
 Minimate figures based on Storm's original costume, her 1990s costume, and her Ultimate X-Men costume have been made.
 Storm was among the Kubrick figures made in Japan of Marvel characters.
 Storm has been issued as collectible statues and busts by Kaiyodo, Bowen Designs, Sideshow, and others.

Music
 Storm and the X-Men were mentioned in the Nicki Minaj song Chun-Li.

References